SodaStream International Ltd. is an Israel-based manufacturing company best-known as the maker of the consumer home carbonation product of the same name. The company's soda machines, in the style of soda siphons, add carbon dioxide to water from a pressurized cylinder to create carbonated water for drinking. It also sells more than 100 types of concentrated syrups and flavourings that are used in the process of making carbonated drinks. In 2018, SodaStream distributed its products to 80,000 individual retail stores across 45 countries.

The company was founded in 1903 in England. After it merged with Soda-Club in 1998, it was relaunched with an emphasis on healthier drinks, and went public on the Nasdaq stock exchange in November 2010. SodaStream is headquartered in Kfar Saba, Israel, and has 13 production plants. In August 2018, the company was acquired by PepsiCo for US$3.2 billion. PepsiCo was attracted to the company due to its technological innovations and a desire to move into providing more healthy products; SodaStream has since launched a variety of PepsiCo flavours into their range.

Until 2015, the company's principal manufacturing facility was located in Mishor Adumim, an industrial park within the Israeli settlement of Ma'ale Adumim in the West Bank, which generated controversy and a boycott campaign. In October 2015, under growing pressure from activists of the Palestinian-led BDS movement, SodaStream closed its facility in Mishor Adumim and relocated it to the town of Lehavim in Israel proper.

Product 

The SodaStream Sparkling Water Maker is a device that forces carbon dioxide (CO2) gas (stored under pressure in a cylinder) into water, making it  sparkling (fizzy). The product includes a machine, a carbon dioxide cylinder, and one or more reusable beverage bottles. The bottle, filled with water, is inserted into the machine, and with a button push or two, compressed CO2 from the cylinder is injected, creating carbonated water. Varieties of concentrated syrups are available, to create regular or diet soft drinks by adding a small amount of concentrate to the bottle after carbonation.

Different flavours are created by adding fruit-flavoured concentrates. During its heyday, several famous brands were available in SodaStream concentrate form including Tizer, Fanta, Sunkist and Irn-Bru. SodaStream and Kraft Foods entered into a partnership in January 2012 involving the use of the Crystal Light and Country Time brand flavours with the SodaStream home carbonation system. That July, the two companies expanded their partnership to include the Kool-Aid flavour line. In 2013, SodaStream partnered with Ocean Spray to market three Ocean Spray flavours for use with the SodaStream home soda maker.

In February 2013, SodaStream and Samsung announced that Samsung refrigerators with built-in SodaStream sparkling water dispensers would be available in the United States beginning in April.

Excluding the purchase price of the machine, typical cost to the end user (2015, United States dollars) is 25 cents per litre of carbonated water generated plus another 50 cents per litre for the soda syrup.

History 
The forerunner of the machine, the "apparatus for aerating liquids", was created in 1903 by Guy Hugh Gilbey of the London gin distillers, W & A Gilbey Ltd., and was sold to the upper classes (including the royal household). Flavoured concentrates such as cherry ciderette and sarsaparilla were introduced in the 1920s, along with commercial carbonation machines, and the first machine for home carbonation of drinks was produced in 1955.

SodaStream machines were popular during the 1970s and 1980s in the UK, and are associated with nostalgia for that period. Their slogan, "Get busy with the fizzy", started as an advertising jingle in 1979 and proved so popular that they added it to their logo. The slogan was dropped in 1996 after 17 years.

In 1985, after various changes of ownership, SodaStream became a wholly owned subsidiary of Cadbury Schweppes, although it operated as an autonomous business within the group. In 1998, SodaStream was bought by Soda-Club, an Israeli company founded in 1991 by Peter Wiseburgh, who from 1978 to 1991 had been Israel's exclusive distributor for SodaStream, creating the world's largest home carbonation systems supplier. In 2003 Soda-Club closed the SodaStream factory in Peterborough, moving the company's gas cylinder refilling and refurbishment department to Germany. Under the ownership of Soda-Club, the brand has been relaunched in many markets, with new machines and new flavours available in 41 countries. In 2012, SodaStream teamed with Yves Béhar to introduce SodaStream Source, a line of soda machines designed with a special emphasis on sustainability. Béhar's design earned SodaStream a Good Housekeeping Institute seal of approval in 2013.

2010 NASDAQ IPO 
SodaStream International Ltd. went public on the NASDAQ stock exchange in November 2010. The stock offering was jointly led by J.P. Morgan Securities and Deutsche Bank Securities. At the time, the IPO was the eighth largest for an Israeli company on the NASDAQ and during the year 2010 one of the top-performing IPOs generally. To celebrate SodaStream's listing on the NASDAQ, CEO Daniel Birnbaum was invited to ring the exchange's closing bell on 3 November 2010. By August 2011, SodaStream's market capitalisation had risen from $367 million to $1.46 billion. During 2012, the stock experienced aggressive growth, with earnings per share growing 57%. In June 2013, Israeli financial newspaper Calcalist incorrectly predicted a $2 billion Pepsi takeover of SodaStream, sending SODA stock higher before the rumours were promptly debunked by PepsiCo.

Analysts had expected another 27% growth in 2013 with earnings projected to grow 30% over the next 5 years. 2013's actual net earnings were down relative to 2012 despite an increase in sales; in 2014, the company's stock dropped to its lowest value since 2012. Barclays PLC analyst David Kaplan cited US Secretary of State John Kerry's warnings about the economic effects of boycotts and the company's failure to clarify the reasons for missed earning targets as causes for the drop.

In October 2014, SodaStream announced its revenue for 2014 was expected to decline to $562.7 million, a 9% decrease from the previous year, while a report by Zacks Equity Research stated that net income for 2014 is expected to be 42% lower than in 2013. Zacks Equity Research cited declining sales in the United States, where an increasing number of consumers are choosing "more natural, less caloric and water based beverages" as opposed to traditional carbonated soft drinks.

Sales 
Some 20% of households in Sweden owned SodaStream machines as of 2010. In January 2011, the company marked the sale of its millionth soda maker in the country. Europe accounts for 45% of SodaStream's sales.

Since May 2012, SodaStream has been sold in over 2,900 Walmart locations in the United States. In June equity research firm Monness Crespi Hardt & Co. stated that SodaStream's machines were selling out at Walmart. Despite record sales, profit margins are declining. SodaStream's estimated 2013 net income ($41.5 million on an annual revenue of $562 million in 2013, compared to 2012's $43.86 million of net income on $436.32 million of revenue) fell short of targets and investor expectations. Sodastream also sells its product at most Bed Bath & Beyond stores.

Marketing 
In its marketing, the company focuses on environmental attractiveness of using tap water and returnable gas cylinders. SodaStream has been involved in environmental projects, including waste reduction, beach cleanup and reforestation.

In 2011, SodaStream partnered with the Israel Union for Environmental Defense to launch an initiative promoting waste reduction and an improvement in the quality of tap water. Also in 2011, SodaStream launched a campaign with Erin O'Connor to raise awareness to the effects of plastic bottle waste on the environment. As part of the company's support for Climate Week, in 2012 SodaStream donated £1,000 to a school in Crediton, Devon in the United Kingdom to fund an educational beach cleaning initiative. SodaStream partnered with Trees for the Future in 2012 to launch the Replant Our Planet initiative: for each home beverage carbonation system sold from its Rethink Your Soda product line, SodaStream committed to planting hundreds of thousands of trees in Brazil. SodaStream Italy and the Municipality of Venice partnered in 2012 to organize Join the Stream: fight the bottle, a cleanup initiative with its starting point at the Lido di Venezia. Actress Rosario Dawson launched the first annual Unbottle the World Day in New York City in July 2012. The campaign, initiated by SodaStream to raise awareness to the impact of cans and plastic bottles on the environment, calls on the United Nations to designate one day of the year a "Bottle Free Day".

Advertising campaigns 
In 2010, SodaStream launched an international campaign to raise awareness of bottle and can consumption. The campaign involves the display of  cages in various countries, each containing 10,657 empty bottles and cans. Begun in Belgium, the Cage campaign has since visited 30 countries with the message that the waste produced by one family over the course of five years from beverage containers – 10,657 bottles and cans – can be replaced by a single SodaStream bottle. When a cage went on display in Johannesburg, South Africa in 2012, Coca-Cola demanded that SodaStream remove its products from the cages and threatened to sue SodaStream. SodaStream responded by dismissing the threats and announcing that it would display the cage outside Coca-Cola's headquarters in Atlanta.

A 30-second television commercial promoting sustainability, showing soda bottles exploding each time a person makes a drink using a SodaStream machine, was banned in the United Kingdom in 2012. Clearcast, the organization that approves TV advertising in the UK, explained that they "thought it was a denigration of the bottled drinks market". The same ad, crafted by Alex Bogusky, ran in the United States, Sweden, Australia, and other countries. An appeal by SodaStream to reverse Clearcast's decision to censor the commercial was rejected. A similar advertisement, which featured a pair of Coca-Cola and Pepsi deliverymen reacting to the exploding bottles, was expected to air during Super Bowl XLVII in February 2013, but was rejected by CBS for its direct references to Coke and Pepsi. The previous SodaStream ad was shown in its place. SodaStream CEO said "The banned ad was a win because of the quality as well as the quantity of the exposure we received".

The company's 2020 advertising campaign featured Snoop Dogg in the United States and Priyanka, the first season winner of Canada's Drag Race, in Canada.

Influencer marketing 

Since 2016, SodaStream has worked with influencer marketing in social media.

Production facilities 
SodaStream has 13 production facilities worldwide. From 2016, SodaStream's principal manufacturing facility is in Idan HaNegev Industrial Park north of Beersheba, Israel. The plant provides employment for around 1,400 workers, many of them Negev Bedouins. The cornerstone for the plant was laid in 2011, it opened in 2015. An additional plant, which began operating in 2011 in Ashkelon, produces SodaStream syrups and flavours. Another plant operated in the Alon Tavor industrial zone near the Israeli city of Afula, between 2011 and 2015, but was closed once the Idan HaNegev facility was opened.

In Europe, the company employs 250 people, in two main sites; at SodaStream's European commercial and logistics center, which is located in Rijen, Netherlands and at a manufacturing facility in Limburg an der Lahn, Germany. SodaStream's US headquarters is at Mount Laurel, New Jersey.

Controversies 
As part of the Boycott, Divestment and Sanctions (BDS) activist campaign launched in 2005 to pressure Israel to end the occupation of the West Bank and Gaza, SodaStream was criticized for operating its primary manufacturing plant in the Mishor Adumim industrial zone in the West Bank.

The Court of Justice of the European Union ruled in 2010 that SodaStream was not entitled to claim a "Made in Israel" exemption from EU customs payments for products manufactured in the West Bank because Israeli settlements in the West Bank are outside the territorial scope of the EC-Israel Agreement.

In January 2014, Oxfam accepted the resignation of Scarlett Johansson, a Jewish-American actress, as ambassador for that organisation, a role she had held for eight years, after she became a brand ambassador for SodaStream. Oxfam has stated that "businesses, such as SodaStream, that operate in settlements further the ongoing poverty and denial of rights of the Palestinian communities that we work to support" and opposes all trade with the settlements citing their illegality under international law. Johansson reportedly resigned because of "a fundamental difference of opinion in regards to the boycott, divestment and sanctions movement". In her statement she described SodaStream as "not only committed to the environment but to building a bridge to peace between Israel and Palestine, supporting neighbours working alongside each other, receiving equal pay, equal benefits and equal rights". SodaStream CEO Daniel Birnbaum also accused Oxfam of supporting the BDS movement against Israel as a whole, a charge Oxfam denied, saying that "this is about trade from the settlements" and specific to settlements outside Israel's pre-1967 border. which Oxfam states, due to their location, pose an obstacle to any future two-state solution.

According to Birnbaum, the boycott had no impact on the growth rate of SodaStream, and he said, all SodaStream products sold in Norway, Sweden and Finland are manufactured in China.

In January 2014 a Paris court ruled that Association France Palestine Solidarité (AFPS), a group campaigning to remove SodaStream from stores, must compensate SodaStream €6500 because the group falsely claimed the products are sold "illegally and fraudulently" due to their use of the "Made in Israel" label while being partly manufactured in the West Bank.

Human Rights Watch stated that "It is impossible to ignore the Israeli system of unlawful discrimination, land confiscation, natural resource theft, and forced displacement of Palestinians in the occupied West Bank, where SodaStream is located".   The United Church of Canada launched a campaign to boycott SodaStream products manufactured in the West Bank.

In July 2014, UK department store John Lewis removed all SodaStream products from its stores, amidst growing BDS pressure and declining sales. Its Oxford Street, London store had been the site of biweekly protests against the sale of SodaStream products. In July 2014, after two years of weekly BDS protests, SodaStream also closed its Brighton store.

Birnbaum said that the factories are apolitical. "We don't take sides in this conflict. He described the factory as "building bridges between us and the Palestinian population, and we provide our Palestinian employees with respectable employment opportunities and an appropriate salary and benefits". SodaStream employed 500 West Bank Palestinians. Addressing the location of SodaStream's Ma'ale Adumim plant, Birnbaum said "we're here for historical reasons." The choice was made by company founder Peter Weissburgh, back in the 1990s, long before SodaStream was taken over by the current owners, who appointed Birnbaum in 2007. Birnbaum said that factory presence was a reality and he would not bow to political pressure to close it: "We will not throw our employees under the bus to promote anyone’s political agenda...I just can't see how it would help the cause of the Palestinians if we fired them."

Supporters of the factory cited the West Bank's high unemployment rate and low GDP as evidence the jobs were badly needed. Opponents argued that the small number of jobs provided by the factories in the settlements did not outweigh the effect the Israeli presence had on the Palestinian economy.  Others argued that SodaStream was exploiting local cheap labour. Workers' incomes at the factory were substantially above the 1450 shekel/month Palestinian Authority minimum wage.

All but one of the Palestinian employees interviewed by The Christian Science Monitor supported Johansson's stance and opposed a boycott of SodaStream, stating that a boycott would only hurt them. One Palestinian employee said he was ashamed to work for SodaStream and felt like a "slave" working on an assembly line for twelve hours a day. Another Palestinian employee interviewed by Reuters reported that: "Most of the managers are Israeli, and West Bank employees feel they can't ask for pay rises or more benefits because they can be fired and easily replaced."

In December 2014, Harvard University Dining Services halted SodaStream machine purchases for its dining facilities due to demonstrations by the Harvard College Palestine Solidarity Committee and the Harvard Islamic Society. A few days later, however, Harvard's President Drew Faust reversed the decision, claiming she had not been aware of it in the first place.

When French host Cyril Hanouna aired a homophobic prank on French TV in May 2017, SodaStream first refused to stop advertising and supporting Hanouna's program, but eventually decided to withdraw its advertising.

Firing of Palestinian workers 

In July 2014, SodaStream fired 60 Palestinian workers after they had complained about not receiving sufficient food to break Ramadan fasts during night shifts. The workers were not allowed to bring their own food into the plant due to Jewish dietary restrictions being enforced. According to SodaStream the workers had called for a wildcat strike. According to the workers they were fired after filing a formal complaint. SodaStream claimed that the workers were given a hearing and that they were not denied severance pay.

SodaStream announced that its factory in Ma'ale Adumim would be closed by the end of 2015 in order to save $9 million in production costs. The plant's operations were transferred to a new factory in Lehavim, where it reportedly "employ a significant number of Bedouin Arabs". The move laid off 500 Palestinian workers, although 74 Palestinian workers moved with SodaStream when it relocated. However, the Israeli government initially refused to renew the Palestinians' work permits. SodaStream protested the government decision. Around a year later, the Israeli government renewed the working permits of the 74 Palestinian workers and they returned to SodaStream.

Some news sources reported that SodaStream blamed the Boycott, Divestment and Sanctions movement (BDS) for the closing of its plant. Mahmoud Nawajaa, the BDS coordinator in Ramallah, called the loss of Palestinian jobs at SodaStream "part of the price that should be paid in the process of ending the occupation". SodaStream CEO Daniel Birnbaum blamed Benjamin Netanyahu for the Palestinian job losses. According to Birnbaum, all of the Palestinian employees had passed Israeli security clearance, but were denied permits to work after Netanyahu intervened. Birnbaum claimed that Netanyahu wanted the Palestinians fired so he could then blame BDS. Netanyahu's office denied Birnbaum's claims.

See also 

 List of Israeli companies

References

Further reading

External links 

 Official SodaStream site
 SodaStream UK advert from 1980 on YouTube
 "Get busy with the fizzy" lyrics
 YouTube video about Sodastream's factory in Mishor Adumim

Carbonated drinks
Carbonated water
Companies formerly listed on the Nasdaq
Drink companies of Israel
Food and drink companies established in 1903
1903 establishments in England
Home appliance manufacturers of Israel
Israeli brands
2010 initial public offerings
2018 mergers and acquisitions
Mergers and acquisitions of Israeli companies
PepsiCo subsidiaries
Kitchenware brands
British companies established in 1903